'Robbie Teasdale (born 20 August 1986) is a professional squash player who represents England. He reached a career-high world ranking of World No. 52 in December 2012
.

Teasdale is the holder of the 1st and 4th British Squash Professional Association (BSPA) Elite Events. He is the semi-finalist of the 2008 Australian Open; losing to David Palmer of Australia.

Robbie is currently playing his squash in and around London.

References

External links 
 
 

English male squash players
Living people
1986 births
Sportspeople from Gloucester